Markijan Trofimiak (born April 16, 1947 in Kozova, Ukraine) is a Roman Catholic bishop, Auxiliary Bishop of Lviv in 1991-1998 and diocesan Bishop of Lutsk in 1998-2012.

Biography

Born in Kozova, Ukraine. He was ordained on May 26, 1974 in Riga at the hands of Cardinal Julijans Vaivods. On January 16, 1991 he was appointed auxiliary bishop of Lviv. He was consecrated and received at the hands of Cardinal Marian Jaworski, on March 2, 1991. On March 25, 1998 Trofimiak was appointed Bishop of the Diocese of Lutsk. For two terms he was deputy chairman of the Conference of Roman Catholic Bishops of Ukraine (until 2009), Chairman of the Committee on the Liturgy and sacred art of the Roman Catholic episcopate. In the Roman Catholic episcopate of Ukraine is responsible for contacts with state authorities.

References

Prokop KR, profiles the bishops łuckich, Bialy Dunajec - Ostrog, 2001

External links
 http://www.catholic-hierarchy.org/bishop/btrof.html
 http://www.gcatholic.org/dioceses/diocese/luts0.htm

1947 births
People from Ternopil Oblast
Ukrainian Roman Catholic bishops
Ukrainian people of Polish descent
Living people